Murfreesboro Municipal Airport  is a city-owned, public-use airport located  north of the central business district of Murfreesboro, a city in Rutherford County, Tennessee, United States. This airport is included in the National Plan of Integrated Airport Systems for 2011–2015, which categorized it as a general aviation airport. Although most U.S. airports use the same three-letter location identifier for the FAA and IATA, this airport is assigned MBT by the FAA, but has no designation from the IATA (which assigned MBT to Masbate Airport in the Philippines).

It is the home of the Middle Tennessee State University Aerospace Department, which has one of the largest university Air Traffic Collegiate Training Initiative (AT-CTI) programs in the country, and their aircraft and simulators. Aircraft owned by MTSU include 30 Diamond DA40s, a Diamond DA20, five Piper PA-44 Seminoles, a Piper PA-18 Super Cub, a de Havilland Canada DHC-2 Beaver, and a Beechcraft King Air 350.

The Murfreesboro Municipal Airport is one of the only general aviation airports in the State of Tennessee that does not receive tax payer money. The money used to maintain the airport is entirely generated by leases and fuel sales.

In 2007 the airport won the Tennessee Airport of the Year award.

Facilities and aircraft 

For the 12-month period ending August 31, 2012, the airport had 40,380 aircraft operations, an average of 111 per day: 99% general aviation, <1% air taxi, and <1% military. At that time there were 128 aircraft based at this airport: 111 single-engine, 16 multi-engine, and 1 ultralight.

References

External links 
 Murfreesboro Municipal Airport
 Aerial image as of March 1997 from USGS The National Map
 
 

Airports in Tennessee
Buildings and structures in Murfreesboro, Tennessee
Transportation in Rutherford County, Tennessee
Buildings and structures in Rutherford County, Tennessee